Peter Leonard Bullock (born 17 November 1941) is an English former footballer who played as an inside forward. He scored 53 goals in 199 appearances in the Football League playing for Stoke City, Birmingham City, Southend United, Colchester United, Exeter City and Walsall.

Career
Bullock was born in Stoke-on-Trent and began his career with Stoke City. He made his debut for Stoke in a 4–1 defeat away at Swansea Town on 19 April 1958 at the age of 16 years and 163 days becoming the club's youngest player, he also scored Stoke's goal thus becoming youngest goalscorer. He scored five goals in 13 appearances in 1958–59 but injury kept him out of the entire 1959–60 season. He returned to the side in 1960–61 under new manager Tony Waddington playing in 19 matches scoring five goals. He scored five goals again in 1961–62 and was sold to First Division Birmingham City for a fee of £10,000. He was never able to live up to his potential at Birmingham and after making 28 appearances in four years he left for Southend United.

Bullock did not stay long at Roots Hall quickly moving to local rivals Colchester United with whom he gained promotion from the Fourth Division in 1965–66. He scored 15 goals in 1966–67 as the "U's" finished in 13th position, but relegation was suffered in 1967–68 and Bullock joined Exeter City in August 1968. He spent just three months at Exeter before returning to Staffordshire and played for non-league Stafford Rangers. He made a short return to professional football playing seven matches for Walsall before retiring.

Personal life
Bullock comes from a footballing family. His elder brother Brian was an amateur with West Bromwich Albion and Stoke City, and younger brother Mickey had a long playing career before going into management. His son Simon played for Halifax Town while Mickey Bullock was manager there.

Career statistics
Source:

References

External links
 

1941 births
Living people
Footballers from Stoke-on-Trent
English footballers
Association football forwards
Stoke City F.C. players
Birmingham City F.C. players
Southend United F.C. players
Colchester United F.C. players
Exeter City F.C. players
Stafford Rangers F.C. players
Walsall F.C. players
English Football League players